The Goodwin-Harrison House is a historic mansion in Macon, Mississippi, U.S.. It was built in 1852 for W. W. Goodwin, a planter. It was designed in the Greek Revival architectural style. From 1873 to 1882, it was home to a boys' school run by W. W. Baird. It was purchased by Nathaniel H. Harrison, a banker, in 1882. It has been listed on the National Register of Historic Places since November 28, 1980.

References

Houses on the National Register of Historic Places in Mississippi
Greek Revival houses in Mississippi
Antebellum architecture
Houses completed in 1852
National Register of Historic Places in Noxubee County, Mississippi
1852 establishments in Mississippi